Sirirat (Noosi) Rueangsri, nicknamed Noo-si (born August 20, 1988 in Chiang Mai, Thailand) is Miss Thailand World 2010. She was crowned Miss Thailand World 2010 on August 14, 2010 by Pongchanok Kanklab, Miss Thailand World 2009.

Pageantry
She placed in the Top 44 in Miss Thailand Universe 2007 and got a spot in the Top 25 in Miss Thailand World 2009, before winning Miss Thailand World 2010. In Miss World 2010, she placed as a Top 25 semi-finalist, the first time for Thailand since 1997.

External links
Official site of Miss Thailand World 2010

1988 births
Living people
Sirirat Rueangsri
Miss World 2010 delegates
Sirirat Rueangsri
Miss Thailand World